The 1970–71 FIBA European Cup Winners' Cup was the fifth edition of FIBA's 2nd-tier level European-wide professional club basketball competition, contested between national domestic cup champions, running from 3 December 1970, to 7 April 1971. It was contested by 26 teams, six more than in the previous edition.

Italy became the first country to win the competition twice in a row, as the 1966 FIBA European Cup champion, Simmenthal Milano, defeated Spartak Leningrad, in the last of the competition's three two-legged finals. It previously defeated defending champion, Fides Napoli, in the semifinals, in the competition's first tie between two clubs from the same country. Olimpia Milano was the third Italian League club to win the FIBA Cup Winners' Cup, after Ignis Varese, and Fides Napoli.

Participants

First round

|}

Second round

|}

Automatically qualified to the quarter finals
 Fides Napoli (title holder)

Quarterfinals

|}

Semifinals

|}

Finals

|}

References

External links 
FIBA European Cup Winner's Cup 1970–71 linguasport.com
FIBA European Cup Winner's Cup 1970–71

Cup
FIBA Saporta Cup